Michael or Mike O'Shea may refer to:

 Michael O'Shea (actor) (1906–1973), American character actor 
 Michael O'Shea (musician) (1947–1991), Northern Irish musician
 Mike O'Shea (Canadian football) (born 1970), Head Coach of the Winnipeg Blue Bombers of the Canadian Football League, & former Canadian football linebacker 
 Mike O'Shea (cricketer) (born 1987), Welsh cricketer
 Mike O'Shea (adventurer) (born 1969), Irish adventurer and safety consultant

See also
 Michael Shea (disambiguation)